These are tables of congressional delegations from Pennsylvania to the United States House of Representatives and the United States Senate.

The current dean of the Pennsylvania delegation is Senator Bob Casey Jr., having served in the Senate since 2007.

United States House of Representatives

Current U.S. House of Representatives from Pennsylvania 
List of members, their terms in office, district boundaries, and the district political ratings according to the CPVI. The delegation has 17 members, with 9 Democrats and 8 Republicans.

1789–1793: 8 seats 
For the first two Congresses, Pennsylvania had eight seats. In the First Congress, Representatives were selected at-large on a general ticket. Districts were used in the Second Congress.

1793–1803: 13 seats 
Pennsylvania had thirteen seats. For the third Congress representatives were selected at-large on a general ticket. After that, districts were created.

1803–1813: 18 seats 
There were eighteen seats, apportioned among eleven districts. Districts 1–3 each had three seats elected on a general ticket. District 4 had two such seats. Districts 5–11 each had one seat.

1813–1823: 23 seats 
There were 15 districts. The 1st district had four seats elected on a general ticket. The 2nd, 3rd, 5th, 6th and 10th each had two seats elected on a general ticket. The rest of the districts each had one seat.

1823–1833: 26 seats

1833–1843: 28 seats 
Following the 1830 census, Pennsylvania was apportioned 28 seats.

1843–1853: 24 seats

1853–1863: 25 seats

1863–1873: 24 seats

1873–1883: 27 seats

1883–1893: 28 seats  
Following the 1880 census, the delegation grew by one seat. Until 1889, that seat was elected at-large statewide.  After 1889, the state was redistricted into 28 districts.

1893–1903: 30 seats 
Following the 1890 census, the delegation grew by two seats. Those two additional seats were elected at-large across the entire commonwealth.

1903–1913: 32 seats  
Following the 1900 census, the delegation grew by two seats.

1913–1933: 36 seats  
Following the 1910 census, the delegation grew by four seats to its largest size to date. The four new seats were elected at-large statewide. Starting in 1923, however, four new districts were added to replace the at-large seats.
The results of the 1920 census revealed a major and continuing shift of the population of the U.S. from rural to urban areas. However, no apportionment was carried out following the 1920 census

1933–1943: 34 seats  
Following the 1930 census, the delegation lost two seats.

1943–1953: 33 seats  
Following the 1940 census, the delegation lost one seat. For the 78th Congress, there were 32 districts and 1 at-large seat. Starting with the 79th Congress, however, there were 33 districts.

1953–1963: 30 seats  
Following the 1950 census, the delegation lost three seats.

1963–1973: 27 seats  
Following the 1960 census, the delegation lost three seats.

1973–1983: 25 seats  
Following the 1970 census, the delegation lost two seats.

1983–1993: 23 seats  
Following the 1980 census, the delegation lost two seats.

1993–2003: 21 seats  
Following the 1990 census, the delegation lost two seats.

2003–2013: 19 seats  
Following the 2000 census, the delegation lost two seats.

2013–2023: 18 seats  
Following the 2010 census, the delegation lost one seat. With court-ordered redistricting in Pennsylvania on February 19, 2018, none of the members of congress who served in 115th Congress and were re-elected are in the same district in the 116th Congress.

2023–present: 17 seats 
Following the 2020 census, the delegation lost one seat.

United States Senate

Key

See also

 List of United States congressional districts
 Pennsylvania's congressional districts
 Political party strength in Pennsylvania

References 

 
 
Pennsylvania
Politics of Pennsylvania
Congressional delegations